Recchia is a genus of trees in the family Surianaceae. It is native to tropical habitats of Mexico.

Species
It includes the following species:
 Recchia connaroides — endemic to Oaxaca state in southwestern Mexico.
 Recchia mexicana — endemic to Colima, Jalisco, and Oaxaca states of southwestern Mexico.
 Recchia simplicifolia  — endemic to Oaxaca and Veracruz states of southern Mexico.

References

Surianaceae
Fabales genera
Flora of Mexico
Taxonomy articles created by Polbot
Taxa named by Martín Sessé y Lacasta
Taxa named by Alphonse Pyramus de Candolle
Taxa named by José Mariano Mociño